Jan Wessel (16 November 1903 – 12 August 1980) was a Norwegian radio engineer, known for having established and operated the Norwegian production company Radionette. The company was the first in Norway to start production of radios for connection to the electrical grid.

Biography 
Wessel was born in Christiania (now Oslo) to operations engineer Henrik Lysholm Wessel (1861–1936) and Sophie Friederike (“Frieda”) Eleonore Weidemann Goebel (1868–1959). He is Great-great-great-grandson of Johan Herman Wessel (1742–85), Ole Christopher Wessel (1744–94) and Caspar Wessel (1745–1818).

Jan Wessel was one of the many self-taught enthusiasts who participated in the pioneering phase of the spread of radio technology in Norway. He stood out early by focusing fully on a commercial utilization of the technology through the design, production and sale of radios to a wide audience, from 1927 through the company Radionette, which grew to become one of the three major radio factories in Norway.

He developed his first radio (a 2-vacuum tube travel radio with a flashlight battery) under the name Radionette, based on German components (Ultra) assembled at his dormitory in Bygdøy in Oslo (1926).

Kurér 

After World War II, he developed the portable radio Kurér. The first model was launched on April 24, 1950. The Kurér had four direct-emitted vacuum tubes and a permanent magnet speaker. It had four wave bands: long wave, medium wave, fishing wave and short wave. It was intended as a travel radio that could also be used at home and could be supplied from both the mains and a battery block with 90 V and 1.5 V voltages. The weight was 7.6 kg with the battery.

Almost 700 copies were made of model no. 1, which was called "square courier" due to the sharp corners. Model No. 2 with round corners was produced until 1958. Kurér was a great success and a total of 224,000 copies were produced. It was also exported to over 60 countries, first to Thailand. Model 2 was delivered in almost 40 different colors, shades and patterns.

Personal relations 
Jan Wessel lived in Bærum and ran the company until retirement (1970). In 1937 he married Liv Christiansen (1908–90) and in 1945 with Gudrun Graverholdt (1915–72).

In 1968 Wessel received an Honorary Award from the Norwegian Research Council for Technical and Natural Sciences.

References 

20th-century Norwegian engineers
1903 births
1980 deaths
Engineers from Oslo
Radio pioneers